Ratei Takpara (born 12 June 1974) is a Togolese former footballer who played as a defender. He made 18 appearances for the Togo national team from 1992 to 1998. He was also named in Togo's squad for the 1998 African Cup of Nations tournament.

References

External links
 

1974 births
Living people
Togolese footballers
Association football defenders
Togo international footballers
1998 African Cup of Nations players
Place of birth missing (living people)
21st-century Togolese people